Leslie William Champelovier (born 23 April 1933)  (Died  28 January 2023) aged 89 years. He was an English amateur footballer who played as an inside forward in the Football League for Brighton & Hove Albion. He was capped three times for the England amateur team.

Life and career
Champelovier was born in Kensington and attended Wood End Park Junior School. He worked in the electronics industry, beginning as an instrument maker for EMI and then as a draughtsman for Cossor. He married Nora Leonard in 1958.

While on National Service duties, Champelovier played football for Ilford, and joined Hayes in 1954 after his discharge. In eight seasons with the club, he scored 137 goals from 266 games, and made numerous appearances in representative matches at various levels. In 1957, he was capped three times for the England amateur team, and scored a hat-trick on his debut, in a 5–0 win against Wales in the British Championship. He also toured with FA Amateur XIs and with Middlesex Wanderers.

He had played for Leyton Orient's reserve team, and in 1954 signed amateur forms for Chelsea, but his only appearance in the Football League was for Brighton & Hove Albion in the Third Division South in October 1957. Having moved to the Harlow area for work, Champelovier played for two seasons for Harlow Town and another one for Cheshunt before giving up the senior game.

References

1933 births
Living people
Footballers from Kensington
English footballers
England amateur international footballers
Association football inside forwards
Ilford F.C. players
Hayes F.C. players
Brighton & Hove Albion F.C. players
Harlow Town F.C. players
Cheshunt F.C. players
Middlesex Wanderers A.F.C. players
English Football League players